Amara Dit Morikè Kallé (born 19 September 1990 in Bamako) is a Malian football (soccer) defender, who plays for AJ Auxerre.

Career 
Kallé began his career with AS Real Bamako and was in July 2008 transferred to AJ Auxerre.

International career
He earned his first full senior national cap for the Mali national football team in 2009 and was formerly member with the team at the Tournoi de l'UEMOA 2007.

References

1990 births
Living people
Sportspeople from Bamako
Malian footballers
Mali international footballers
Expatriate footballers in France
Association football defenders
Ligue 1 players
AJ Auxerre players
AS Real Bamako players
21st-century Malian people